NHD may refer to:

 National History Day, US
 National Hydrography Dataset, US
 Networked Help Desk
 New Hacker's Dictionary, of computer slang
 Noordhollands Dagblad, a Dutch newspaper
 Al Minhad Air Base, United Arab Emirates, IATA code
 Nunhead railway station, London, England, station code
 nHD, a graphic-display resolution of 640x360 pixels
 Ava Guarani language of Paraguay, Brazil, and Argentina, ISO 639-3 code